Péter Sós (born 3 January 1938) is a Hungarian gymnast. He competed in eight events at the 1964 Summer Olympics.

References

1938 births
Living people
Hungarian male artistic gymnasts
Olympic gymnasts of Hungary
Gymnasts at the 1964 Summer Olympics
Gymnasts from Budapest